Dinochares notolepis is a moth in the family Lecithoceridae first described by Kyu-Tek Park in 1999. It is found in Taiwan.

The wingspan is 12–18 mm. The forewings are elongated and rather lanceolate without a characteristic pattern. The hindwings are silvery white.

Etymology

References

Moths described in 1999
Lecithocerinae